Darnley Island  or Erub in the native Papuan language, Meriam Mir, is an island formed by volcanic action and situated in the eastern section of the Torres Strait, Queensland, Australia. It is one of the Torres Strait Islands and is located near the Great Barrier Reef and just south of the Bligh entrance. The town on the island is also called Darnley, but the locality is called Erub Island, both being within the local government area of Torres Strait Island Region.

The effective community language is Brokan (Torres Strait Creole), though many people also still speak Meriam Mir, the traditional language.

History
The island was named by Captain William Bligh in 1792 during his second breadfruit voyage to the Pacific, after his distant relative, the Earl of Darnley.

In 1871 representatives of the London Missionary Society (LMS) arrived in the Torres Straits on the vessel Surprise, a ship owned or chartered by the LMS, after the French Government had demanded their removal from the Loyalty Islands and New Caledonia in 1869. They decided to expand into the Torres Straits and New Guinea. They were represented by two Englishmen, Reverend Samuel Macfarlane and Reverend A.W. Murray, and eight Lifu (Loyalty Islander) evangelists: Tapeso, Elia, Mataika, Guchong, Kerisidui, Wauaded, Sevine and Josaia, and their wives. The missionaries reached Erub  on 1 July 1871, an event that came to be known as the "Coming of the Light". One of the tribal elders of the island, Dabad, met them at Kemus (or Kernus) Beach after which he introduced them to Amani, another tribal elder, and the rest of the Erub Islanders. His role in the bringing of Christianity to the Torres Straits is memorialised by Dabad's Monument at Badog. The inscription reads "In loving memory of Dabad 1871: A man who denied his tribal laws and accepted the good news of salvation". All Torres Strait Island communities celebrate the Coming of the Light annually on 1 July.

Pearlers and beche-de-mer gatherers visited the island. Over many years, these industries attracted an influx of seamen from the Pacific Islands, the Philippines, and Malaya, many of whom married local women and settled on the island.

In the early 20th century, the Queensland Government started installing various facilities such as a school, medical aid, post office and an Island Industries Board store.

In 1919 the All Saints Church was constructed at the former site of the original London Missionary Society mission house and school. Locally produced lime from burnt coral and basalt was used and the work was done under the direction of Manai, an Erub Islander, and Ware, a South Sea Islander. It was originally known as the Ziona church.

Darnley Island State School opened on 29 January 1985, replacing the earlier mission school. On 1 January 2007 it became the Darnley Island Campus of the Tagai State College (with its main campus on Thursday Island). 

Darnley people have been at the forefront of the movement for adequate recognition of Torres Strait Islanders' rights. From the 1960s to the '90s, George Mye (Torres Strait Islander) was an elder and among the most prominent advocates of Islander interests. Carlemo Wacando was among the first to challenge the legal notion of terra nullius, which Australia had posited to support their annexation of traditional lands. The High Court of Australia ruled in Mabo v Queensland (No 2) (1992) in favor of traditional land ownership of the Torres Strait Islanders, which also applied to Australian aboriginal claims in their territories. The Native Title Act of 1993 was passed to administer these changes.

Pau Enterprises Indigenous Corporation was established in 2015 to manage and maintain the Pau family native title lands and interests on Darnley Island. It also seeks to create social enterprises on Darnley Island and other locations where its community members have migrated, such as Cairns.

Darnley Island became better known around Australia in 2015 when the acting school principal asked via social media for donations of books to assist her primary school children and their education. Her efforts resulted in more than 18,000 shares on Facebook, and hundreds of books were sent to the island.

Flora and fauna
The Kinabalu giant earthworm, Pheretima darnleiensis, is named after Darnley Island, although it is likely an introduced species there.

Heritage listings

Darnley Island has a heritage-listed site: All Saints Anglican Church.

Amenities 
The Torres Strait Island Regional Council operate an Indigenous Knowledge Centre at Madige Village on Erub.

There are two stores, one school, and a health centre. Accommodation is available through Norah's Guest House, and the council run 'five star' dongas.

Education 
Darnley Island Campus is a primary (Early Childhood-6) campus of Tagai State College. There is no secondary school on the island.

See also

Darnley Island Airport
List of Torres Strait Islands

References

Further reading 

 Teske, Travis, and Selly Thaiday. Darnley, Island of Torres Strait / Photography & Co-Ordination: Travis Teske ; Information: Selly Thaiday ... [et Al.]. Far Northern Schools Development Unit, 1987.

External links

 Mye on behalf of Erubam Le v State of Queensland (2004), FCA 1573 (8 December 2004)
 Passion and Professionalism by Dorothy Walker and Lynetee Griffiths; short video about an education project for indigenous students on Darnley Island, 2 min 42 sec, published by State Library of Queensland as part of Storylines:Q150 digital stories
 Erub: The Coming of the Light Digital Story, a video complimenting the Darnley Island Arts Centre linocuts that were on display at 'The Coming of The Light' festival. Video published by State Library of Queensland as part of the "Islands: Hidden histories from Queensland islands' exhibition
 Photographs at 'The Coming of the Light' celebrations, Erub Island, 2009, State Library of Queensland
 At Our Table: Erub Island Digital Story, a digital story focusing on the traditional methods of catching, cooking and eating food on the island. Available on State Library of Queensland catalogue
 Photographs of Church Service at All Saints Anglican Church, Erub Island, State Library of Queensland
 Weaving Exchange: Erub Island and Hopevale, footage of weaving workshop run by a group of weavers from Erub, Torres Strait and Hope Vale, Cape York. Available on State Library of Queensland catalogue

 
Torres Strait Islands
Torres Strait Island Region
Torres Strait Islands communities